Delceita Oakley (22 April 1944 – 28 June 2019) was a Panamanian sprinter. She competed in the women's 100 metres at the 1964 Summer Olympics.

References

External links
 

1944 births
2019 deaths
Athletes (track and field) at the 1964 Summer Olympics
Panamanian female sprinters
Olympic athletes of Panama
Place of birth missing
Central American and Caribbean Games medalists in athletics
Olympic female sprinters
20th-century Panamanian women
21st-century Panamanian women